Olinger may refer to 
Olinger, Pennsylvania, a fictional town that appears in John Updike works
Olinger, Missouri
Olinger, Virginia